The Bồ Đề River is a river of Cà Mau Province, Vietnam. It flows for 10 kilometres.

References

Rivers of Cà Mau province
Rivers of Vietnam